Internationalist Communist Party may refer to:

 Internationalist Communist Party (France), a French political party
 Internationalist Communist Party (Italy), an Italian political party